Metaphase ( and ) is a stage of mitosis in the eukaryotic cell cycle in which chromosomes are at their second-most condensed and coiled stage (they are at their most condensed in anaphase). These chromosomes, carrying genetic information, align in the equator of the cell before being separated into each of the two daughter cells. Metaphase accounts for approximately 4% of the cell cycle's duration.
Preceded by events in prometaphase and followed by anaphase, microtubules formed in prophase have already found and attached themselves to kinetochores in metaphase.

In metaphase, the centromeres of the chromosomes convene themselves on the metaphase plate (or equatorial plate), an imaginary line that is equidistant from the two centrosome poles. This even alignment is due to the counterbalance of the pulling powers generated by the opposing kinetochore microtubules, analogous to a tug-of-war between two people of equal strength, ending with the destruction of B cyclin. In certain types of cells, chromosomes do not line up at the metaphase plate and instead move back and forth between the poles randomly, only roughly lining up along the middleline. Early events of metaphase can coincide with the later events of prometaphase, as chromosomes with connected kinetochores will start the events of metaphase individually before other chromosomes with unconnected kinetochores that are still lingering in the events of prometaphase.

One of the cell cycle checkpoints occurs during prometaphase and metaphase. Only after all chromosomes have become aligned at the metaphase plate, when every kinetochore is properly attached to a bundle of microtubules, does the cell enter anaphase. It is thought that unattached or improperly attached kinetochores generate a signal to prevent premature progression to anaphase, even if most of kinetochores have been attached and most of the chromosomes have been aligned. Such a signal creates the mitotic spindle checkpoint. This would be accomplished by regulation of the anaphase-promoting complex, securin, and separase.

Metaphase in cytogenetics and cancer studies

The analysis of metaphase chromosomes is one of the main tools of classical cytogenetics and cancer studies. Chromosomes are condensed (thickened) and highly coiled in metaphase, which makes them most suitable for visual analysis. Metaphase chromosomes make the classical picture of chromosomes (karyotype). For classical cytogenetic analyses, cells are grown in short term culture and arrested in metaphase using mitotic inhibitor. Further they are used for slide preparation and banding (staining) of chromosomes to be visualised under microscope to study structure and number of chromosomes (karyotype). Staining of the slides, often with Giemsa (G banding) or Quinacrine, produces a pattern of in total up to several hundred bands. Normal metaphase spreads are used in methods like FISH and as a hybridization matrix for comparative genomic hybridization (CGH) experiments.

Malignant cells from solid tumors or leukemia samples can also be used for cytogenetic analysis to generate metaphase preparations. Inspection of the stained metaphase chromosomes allows the determination of numerical and structural changes in the tumor cell genome, for example, losses of chromosomal segments or translocations, which may lead to chimeric oncogenes, such as bcr-abl in chronic myelogenous leukemia.

See also
Interphase
Prophase
Prometaphase
Anaphase
Telophase
Cytoskeleton

References

External links
 

Mitosis
Cell cycle

de:Mitose#Metaphase